Myrna Crenshaw Brown (July 6, 1959 – April 1, 2007), best known as Screechy Peach, was an American singer and songwriter.

Initially the lead singer of Whild Peach, alongside her husband, guitarist David Whild, she would acquire fame in the 1990s due to her collaboration with such artists as Outkast and Macy Gray.

Illness and death
In 1996, she was diagnosed with breast cancer. She died from the disease on April 1, 2007, aged 47, in Decatur, Georgia.

The Class of 3000 episode "Too Cool For School" was dedicated to her memory.

Discography
OutKast - Speakerboxx/The Love Below
Co-wrote "Church" & "Bust"
Performed on "I Like The Way You Move" "Church", "Bust", "Unhappy", "Ghetto Musick", "Happy Valentine"s Day", "Bowtie" and "War"
 Outkast - Idlewild
 Wrote & Performed "Mutron Angel"
 Co-Wrote & Performed on "The Train"
 Co-Wrote & Performed on "A Bad Note"
 Joi - Tennessee Slim Is The Bomb
 Performed on "Co Stars"
 Outkast - Aquemini
 Co-wrote "Liberation"
 Performed on various tracks
 Khujo Goodie - The Man Not The Dawg
 Produced, co-wrote & performed on "Pimpz & Hoz" & "Shawtly"
Pink - "Can"t Take Me Home"
 Performed on "You Make Me Sick" re-mix
 Raphael Saadiq - Live at the House Of Blues
 Performed on all tracks
Big Gipp - Mutant Mindframe
 Performed on "Creeks"
Killa Mike - Monster
 Performed on "A.D.I.D.A.S." and Monster
Joi - Amoeba Cleansing Syndrome
 Performed on "U Turn Me On"
 OutKast - Big Boi & Dre Present Outkast Greatest Hits
 Performed on "The Whole World"
OutKast - Atliens
 Co-wrote "You May Die"
 Performed on various tracks
Goodie Mob - Still Standing
 Produced & co-wrote "Just About Over", performed on "Just About Over" & "They Don't Dance No Mo", "I Feel Responsible" and "The Walk"
 Soundtrack - Scooby Doo Original Movie Soundtrack
Performed on "Land Of A Million Drums"
 Backbone - "Concrete Law"
 Performed on "Yes Yes Ya"ll", "Believe That" and "Under Streetlights"
 Soundtrack - Tomb Raider Original Movie Soundtrack
 Performed on "Speed Ballin"
Soundtrack - Ali Original Movie Soundtrack
 Performed on "Set Me Free" & "Death Letter"
 Dungeon Family - Even In Darkness
 Performed on "Follow The Light" and "Rollin"
 Slimm Calhoun - "The Skinny"
 Performed on "Dirt Work", "Current Events" and "Red Clay"
OutKast - Stankonia
 Performed on various tracks
Witch Doctor - Witch Doctor
 Performed on "Goo Goo Eyes"
Lil Will -
 Wrote, co-produced, & performed on "I Still Love You", performed on "Georgia Girl"
Soundtrack - Shaft
 Performed on "Automatic"
TLC - Fanmail
 Performed on "Silly Ho"
Cool Breeze - East Points Greatest Hits
 Co-wrote "Ghetto Camelot" Performed on "Ghetto Camelot", "Creatine", "East Pointed" and "The Field"
 Soundtrack - Light It Up Original Movie Soundtrack
 Performed on "High Schoolin"
 Macy Gray - Macy Gray On How Life Is
 Performed on "Git Up, Git Out, Git Something"

References

1959 births
2007 deaths
American rhythm and blues singers
Deaths from breast cancer
Deaths from cancer in Georgia (U.S. state)
Musicians from Atlanta
People from DeSoto, Texas
Singers from Texas
Singers from Georgia (U.S. state)
20th-century African-American women singers
21st-century African-American women singers